ESN vid Åbo Akademi r.f. (also known as ESN Åbo Akademi or ESN ÅA) is the official ESN section of the Erasmus Student Network at Åbo Akademi University, the only Swedish-speaking multidisciplinary university in Finland. Even if ESN stands for Erasmus Student Network, referring to the European Erasmus programme, the section doesn't limit its program to only European students but focuses on all international minded students in Åbo (in Finnish Turku), Finland.

ESN Åbo Akademi was founded 1994 and is the second oldest ESN Section in Finland. Historically ESN Åbo Akademi has been a very active section being the first one in Finland to officially register at the national association office, and having had several former actives working on the ESN International level.

The section aims at fostering the integration between international students and local students in Åbo, Finland. This is done by organizing trips, both within Finland and abroad, cultural events, parties, sport events, etc.



Background

Åbo Akademi University has every year over 200 exchange students and hundreds of international students and researchers. The international students reach over 10% of the total number of students in the university which makes Åbo Akademi University the most international university in Finland.

The association aims at fostering the integration between the exchange students and the local students at Åbo Akademi University and to improve the well-being of the exchange students in Åbo. The section organizes trips, parties, sport and cultural events, etc.

In Åbo there is, except ESN ÅA, also two other ESN sections: ESN IAC and ESN Uni Turku. Together with ESN ÅA the three sections form the unofficial ESN Turku - Åbo, which organizes most of the biggest ESN events in the city.

History

ESN ÅA joined the ESN network in 1994, and is the second oldest ESN section in Finland. The section has been, since it was founded, very active on all levels - Local, National and International, having had several National Representatives representing Finland on the international level, and also having had board members in the ESN International board, the most prestige duties within the ESN organization.

During recent years ESN Åbo Akademi has cooperated a lot with the two other ESN sections in Turku and so improved its activities notably. ESN Åbo Akademi has also taken a very active role in the work of the new, in 2010 registered, ESN Finland ry., being responsible for several projects within this organization.

ESN Åbo Akademi traditions

Being from the only Swedish-speaking multidisciplinary university in Finland, ESN Åbo Akademi has during the years established some traditions different from other ESN Sections in Finland. The most important is the Sitz Parties, a tradition involving informal dinner parties including a lot of singing. This tradition comes originally from Sweden, but has a long history within the Swedish-speaking minority in Finland.

In Finland an important tradition is the student boilersuits used by the students especially during informal parties. ESN gots since 2009 also its own ones. ESN in Åbo/Turku was the first city in Finland to get own boilersuits, after which it also spread to other cities and ESN sections in Finland. Each year over 250 international student acquire student boilersuits from ESN or from their own subject associations.

ESN Turku-Åbo organizes also twice a year a City Race for the new international students. This race takes the students around Åbo and gets them to know important and touristic places in the city. International tutors and members of ESN Åbo Akademi cooperate in this event.

Since 2010 ESN ÅA organises the weekly sports events, mostly Futsal. ESN Åbo Akademi, since several years ago, also organizes monthly theme movie evenings. Beginning with the Finnish movie evening and later also other themes such as Horror, Swedish movies, Comedy, etc.

Former ESN Åbo Akademi actives

Catharina Lindström / First National Representative of Finland 1999
Catharina Lindström / Secretary of ESN International 1999
Hanna-Maija Saarinen / National Representative 2002
Hanna-Maija Saarinen / President of ESN International 2002–2003
Ilona Salonen / National Representative 2003
Heidi Hietala / National Representative 2008
Aino Lyytikäinen / Officially registered ESN ÅA as the association 2008-2009
Pancho ESN Åbo Akademi / Official Mascot since 2010
Oscar Boije / Vice President of ESN Sweden 2010-2011
Oscar Boije / National Representative of ESN Sweden 2011-2012
Jerzy Janusz Jasielec / National Representative of ESN Finland 2011-2012
Jerzy Janusz Jasielec / Network and Events Committee Chair 2012-2013
Oscar Boije / Partnership Manager of ESN International 2014-2016

ESN Åbo Akademi Board 2014 

Chairman
Jasmine Malla

Vice-Chairman
Gabriela Lönngren

Local Representative
Jerzy (Jurek) Jasielec

Treasurer 
Veera Juutilainen

Secretary
Sara Karlsson

Public Relations 
Michaela Lindqvist

Official Mascot
Pancho ESN Åbo Akademi (Mexico/China/Finland)

References

External links
 Facebook group of ESN vid Åbo Akademi r.f. ESN ÅA Facebook Group
 Facebook profile of ESN vid Åbo Akademi r.f. Pancho ESN Åbo Akademi
 Facebook group of ESN Turku - Åbo ESN Turku - Åbo Facebook Group
 Website of Åbo Akademi University www.abo.fi
 Website of ESN International www.esn.org
 Website of ESN Uni Turku www.esnuniturku.fi
 Platform where ESN sections are shown galaxy.esn.org
 Annual ESN International Survey
 Erasmus for Students; website of the European Commission
The official ESN Song

Educational organisations based in Finland
Student exchange
Desiderius Erasmus